Shawn Roberts (born April 2, 1984) is a Canadian actor best known for his roles in zombie films such as Land of the Dead, Diary of the Dead and the Resident Evil franchise.

Early life
Roberts was born in Stratford, Ontario.

Career
Roberts started acting when he played the wolf in a school play of Little Red Riding Hood, which was seen by award-winning screenwriter Robert Forsythe. Forsythe, a friend of Roberts' father, helped him get a role in Emily of New Moon. Afterwards, he gained a role on Goosebumps as Brian O'Connor in the two-part episode, The Perfect School. Roberts went on to play Dean Walton in the Canadian television series Degrassi: The Next Generation. He has also co-starred with Anna Paquin. His film works include George A. Romero's Land of the Dead and Diary of the Dead. In 2010, he appeared in Resident Evil: Afterlife, where he played villain Albert Wesker. He reprised the role of Wesker in 2012 in Resident Evil: Retribution.

In 2020 he starred in a television movie Love Under the Olive Tree, portraying Adam Cauldfield—the lead character's gay best friend and her co-worker. He starred as Spartacus in the season 6 premiere of Legends of Tomorrow.

Known for his heavily muscular physique. His biggest influences in acting include action stars: Arnold Schwarzenegger, Bruce Willis, and Sylvester Stallone.

Filmography

Film

Television

Awards and nominations

References

External links
 

1984 births
Living people
People from Stratford, Ontario
Canadian male film actors
Canadian male television actors
Male actors from Ontario
20th-century Canadian male actors
21st-century Canadian male actors